Notomulciber bryanti is a species of beetle in the family Cerambycidae. It was described by Stephan von Breuning in 1939. It is known from Sri Lanka.

It's 12–14 mm long and 3⅔–4 mm wide, and its type locality is Kandy, Sri Lanka. It was named in honor of British entomologist Gilbert Ernest Bryant (1878–1965).

References

Homonoeini
Beetles described in 1939
Taxa named by Stephan von Breuning (entomologist)